Deutzia ( or ) is a genus of about 60 species of flowering plants in the family Hydrangeaceae, native to eastern and central Asia (from the Himalayas east to Japan and the Philippines), and Central America and also Europe. By far the highest species diversity is in China, where 50 species occur.

Most are deciduous, but a few subtropical species are evergreen. The leaves are opposite, simple, with a serrated margin. The flowers are produced in panicles or corymbs; they are white in most species, sometimes pink or reddish. The fruit is a dry capsule containing numerous small seeds. Identification of the species is very difficult, requiring often microscopic detail of the leaf hairs and seed capsule structure.

Deutzia is named after the 18th century Dutch patron of botany, Johan van der Deutz.

Selected species

Cultivation and uses
The deutzias are fairly new to gardens: the exception, D. scabra, was noticed in Japanese gardens by Engelbert Kaempfer (1712) and Carl Peter Thunberg (1784) but not actually seen in Europe till the 1830s; two-thirds of the species noted in the R.H.S. Dictionary were gathered in from the wild during the 20th century.
 
Deutzias are commonly grown as ornamental plants for their white and pink flowers. Many cultivars and hybrids have been selected for garden use, including selections with double flowers. For example, Deutzia × lemoinei is a hybrid of D. gracilis and D. parviflora. The following cultivars and hybrids have gained the Royal Horticultural Society's Award of Garden Merit:-

Deutzia gracilis 'Nikko'
Deutzia monbeigii 
Deutzia scabra ‘Candidissima’
Deutzia scabra ‘Codsall Pink’ 
Deutzia setchuenensis var. corymbiflora
Deutzia × elegantissima 'Rosealind'
Deutzia × hybrida ‘Contraste’ 
Deutzia × hybrida 'Mont Rose' 
Deutzia × hybrida 'Strawberry Fields'

The temperate deutzias are mostly hardy shrubs from far eastern regions where winters are dependably frozen; in milder climates, like much of England, the early-flowering species and hybrids are coaxed into premature bloom by mild spells, then spoilt by frost. Alice Coats remarks that deutzias have done better in Edinburgh, on the chilly east coast of Scotland, than in London. A solution in milder climates might be to site deutzia in the garden's most exposed, coldest microclimate, as is often done with early-flowering magnolias.
 
Identification can be difficult, and in particular, many of the plants in cultivation sold as D. scabra are actually D. crenata (Huxley 1992). The selected hybrid white double "Pride-of-Rochester", already in cultivation in 1881, was originated by the Rochester, New York nurserymen Ellwanger and Barry.

Deutzia scabra is used by joiners in Japan to polish wood.

References

External links

 Flora of Pakistan: Deutzia
 Flora of Nepal checklist: Deutzia
 

 
Cornales genera